In astronomy, a trojan is a small celestial body (mostly asteroids) that shares the orbit of a larger body, remaining in a stable orbit approximately 60° ahead of or behind the main body near one of its Lagrangian points  and . Trojans can share the orbits of planets or of large moons.

Trojans are one type of co-orbital object. In this arrangement, a star and a planet orbit about their common barycenter, which is close to the center of the star because it is usually much more massive than the orbiting planet. In turn, a much smaller mass than both the star and the planet, located at one of the Lagrangian points of the star–planet system, is subject to a combined gravitational force that acts through this barycenter. Hence the smallest object orbits around the barycenter with the same orbital period as the planet, and the arrangement can remain stable over time.

In the Solar System, most known trojans share the orbit of Jupiter. More than a million Jupiter trojans larger than one kilometer are thought to exist, of which more than 7,000 are currently catalogued. In other planetary orbits only nine Mars trojans, 28 Neptune trojans, two Uranus trojans, and two Earth trojans, have been found to date. A temporary Venus trojan is also known. Numerical orbital dynamics stability simulations indicate that Saturn and Uranus probably do not have any primordial trojans.

The same arrangement can appear when the primary object is a planet and the secondary is one of its moons, whereby much smaller trojan moons can share its orbit. All known trojan moons are part of the Saturn system. Telesto and Calypso are trojans of Tethys, and Helene and Polydeuces of Dione.

Trojan minor planets

In 1772, the Italian–French mathematician and astronomer Joseph-Louis Lagrange obtained two constant-pattern solutions (collinear and equilateral) of the general three-body problem. In the restricted three-body problem, with one mass negligible (which Lagrange did not consider), the five possible positions of that mass are now termed Lagrange points.

The term "trojan" originally referred to the "trojan asteroids" (Jovian trojans) that orbit close to the Lagrangian points of Jupiter. These have long been named for figures from the Trojan War of Greek mythology. There are two exceptions, which were named before the convention was put in place, the Greek 624 Hektor and the Trojan 617 Patroclus.

Astronomers estimate that the Jovian trojans are about as numerous as the asteroids of the asteroid belt.

Later on, objects were found orbiting near the Lagrangian points of Neptune, Mars, Earth, Uranus, and Venus. Minor planets at the Lagrangian points of planets other than Jupiter may be called Lagrangian minor planets.

There are 28 known Neptunian trojans, but the large Neptunian trojans are expected to outnumber the large Jovian trojans by an order of magnitude.
 was confirmed to be the first known Earth trojan in 2011. It is located in the  Lagrangian point, which lies ahead of the Earth.  was found to be another Earth trojan in 2021. It is also at L4.
 was identified as the first Uranus trojan in 2013. It is located at the  Lagrangian point. A second one, was announced in 2017.
 is a temporary Venusian trojan, the first one to be identified.
The large asteroids Ceres and Vesta have temporary trojans.

Trojans by planet

Stability
Whether or not a system of star, planet, and trojan is stable depends on how large the perturbations are to which it is subject. If, for example, the planet is the mass of Earth, and there is also a Jupiter-mass object orbiting that star, the trojan's orbit would be much less stable than if the second planet had the mass of Pluto.

As a rule of thumb, the system is likely to be long-lived if m1 > 100m2 > 10,000m3 (in which m1, m2, and m3 are the masses of the star, planet, and trojan).

More formally, in a three-body system with circular orbits, the stability condition is 27(m1m2 + m2m3 + m3m1) < (m1 + m2 + m3)2. And if the star were hyper-massive, m1→+∞, then under Newtonian gravity, the system is stable whatever the planet and trojan masses. And if  = , then both must exceed 13+√168 ≈ 25.9615. However, this all assumes a three-body system; once other bodies are introduced, even if distant and small, stability of the system requires even larger ratios.

See also

Jupiter trojan
Lissajous orbit
List of objects at Lagrange points
Tadpole orbit

References